Brandstetter (German: habitational name for someone from any of the many places called Brandstatt, Brandstädt, Brandstätt, Brandstett and Brandstetten all from the element meaning "place cleared by burning") is a German surname. Notable people with the surname include:
 Hans Brandstetter (1854–1925), Austrian sculptor
 Josef Brandstetter (1891–1945), Austrian amateur football player
 Renward Brandstetter (1860–1942), Swiss philologist and linguist
 Simon Brandstetter (born 1990), German footballer
 Wolfgang Brandstetter (born 1957), Austrian politician and legal scholar

See also 
 Brandstätter
 Branstetter

German-language surnames
German toponymic surnames